The National Debt of South Africa is the total quantity of money borrowed by the Government of South Africa at any time through the issue of securities by the South African Treasury and other government agencies.

As of 2021/22 total South African government debt was $130 billion. The country's debt to GDP ratio in October 2020 was calculated at 82.76% of GDP by the International Monetary Fund.  

Roughly 90% of the national debt in 2019/20 was denominated in South African rand thereby reducing borrowing risk due to currency fluctuations. By September 2020 around US$157 billion of South Africa's national debt was externally owned. As of December 2021 the share of domestic bonds held by foreign investors was 28.2%, this represented a declined to a 10-year low.

History

Apartheid era 
During apartheid South Africa faced a worsening financial situation stemming from an economic recession and increasing international sanctions in the 1980s. In 1980 the country's total debt amounted to US$ 16.9 billion, representing a debt to GDP ratio of 20%. By 1984 the country's debt had increased to US$24.3 billion representing a debt to GDP ratio of 46%. The deteriorating political situation stemming from apartheid policies resulted in "huge capital outflows and a temporary closure of foreign exchange markets" between 1984 and 1985. In August 1985 the stability of South Africa's financial situation was put under severe pressure following P.W. Botha's Rubicon speech. The speech and the lack of commitment by the government to roll back apartheid legislation resulted in a sovereign default on the debt when global lenders refused to rollover South Africa’s debts. The final payment of $6.89 billion on the $13.6 billion 1985 debt was made by the South African government in 2001.

Post-apartheid era 

By 2009 South Africa's debt to GDP ratio dropped to 28% from 34.6% in 2006. South Africa's debt grew between 2008 and 2012 as the country prepared for the 2010 FIFA World Cup and run a countercyclical fiscal policy in response to the financial crisis of 2007-2008. This increased the debt to GDP ratio to 43.9% of GDP by 2014.

Future expectations of the debt 

As of 2020, at current rates of expenditure and revenue generation it is expected that by 2028/29 the country's debt to GDP ratio will exceed 100%. The COVID-19 pandemic saw a notable increase in South Africa's national debt as government borrowing increased to fund economic stimulus and combat the pandemic. Halting the growth, or reducing, the amount of the national budget allocated to paying civil servants is seen as an important part of reducing the growth of the national debt.

See also 

 List of countries by public debt
Economy of South Africa
Taxation in South Africa

External links 

 South African national debt clock

References 

 
Government of South Africa
Economy of South Africa
Government debt by country